Sir Neil MacNally O'Neill (January 1658 – 8 July 1690), 2nd Baronet of Killylagh, County Antrim, was an Irish Jacobite soldier. He was the Lord of Clandeboye.

O'Neill's portrait from 1680 by John Michael Wright is historically significant because it is the only surviving contemporary presentation of the traditional costume of an Irish chieftain. At his feet is the armour of a Japanese samurai as a symbol of victory over the oppression of Catholics; next to him is an Irish wolfhound as a symbol of Ireland.

Life
An Irish Catholic noble and military leader, he was born January 1658, the son of Sir Henry O'Neill, 1st Baronet of Shane's Castle, Killelagh, known in Gaelic as Anrí Cú Uladh ('the Hound of Ulster'), and Eleanor Talbot, daughter of Sir William Talbot, 1st Baronet. His uncle was Richard Talbot, 1st Earl of Tyrconnell and Viceroy of Ireland. His male line genealogy is Neil son of Henry son of Niall Og son of Niall son of Hugh son of Felim Baccach son of Niall Mor son of Conn son of Aodh Buidhe son of Brian Ballach son of Muircheartach Cennfhada (Chiefs of Clandeboye) son of Henry, King of Tír Eóghain County Tyrone.

O'Neill was appointed Lord Lieutenant of Armagh by King James VII and II in 1689. He led 800 Jacobite dragoons at the Battle of the Boyne against Williamite troops under the command of the Duke of Schomberg and was killed in action. He was wounded in the battle, near Slane. He was carried first to Dublin and thence to Waterford where he died of his wounds due to the negligence of his surgeons. His grave is in the cemetery of the French Church in Waterford; the gravestone reads:
Here lyes the body of S. Neal O'Neill, Baronet of Killelag in the County of Antrim, who dyed ye 8th of July, in the year 1690, at the age of 32 years and six months. He married the second daughter of Lord Viscount Molyneux, of Sefton, in Lancashire, in England. Reguiescant in Pace.T. O'Reilly: Rebel Heart, Mercier, Blackrock, Co. Dublin in 2009, S. 253 f.

Family
O'Neill married in 1677 or 1683 Frances Molyneux, second daughter of The 3rd Viscount Molyneux, the Lord Lieutenant of Lancashire, and his wife Mary Barlow.
With her, he had at least four daughters: Rose, Mary, Elizabeth and Ann. His wife and daughters were painted by the Irish painter Garret Murphy c. 1700. Rose married Nicholas Wogan of Rathcoffey, and Anne married John Segrave.

As he had no son, the title passed to his brother Daniel, but was forfeited in 1691. Daniel managed to retain much of the family estates, but as his brother had died deeply in debt, he was obliged to sell Killyleagh in 1703. Frances died in 1732. His only sister Rose, foster daughter of Rose O'Neill the Marchioness of Antrim, married Captain Con Modera O'Neill, son of Colonel Con mac Brian O'Neill, both of whom fought with him at the Battle of Boyne, and the former leading the heroic efforts of the Irish forces at the Second Siege of Aughrim.

References

External links
 

1658 births
1690 deaths
17th-century Irish people
Baronets in the Baronetage of Ireland
Irish Jacobites
Irish soldiers in the army of James II of England
O'Neill dynasty
War-related deaths